Rent-a-Hero is a graphic adventure game developed by the Austrian studio Neo Software (later Rockstar Vienna) and published by Magic Bytes in 1998, and by SouthPeak Interactive in 2000.

Gameplay
Rent-a-Hero is an adventure game controlled with a point-and-click interface.

Story
Rent-a-Hero is set in a fantasy world on the island of Tol Andar. Its protagonist, Rodrigo, is a professional "hero for hire" who undertakes quests for a price. He struggles to compete with Tol Andar's many other mercenary heroes. When Rodrigo's rivals are called away to help combat a pirate invasion, he receives the job of finding Jasmin, wife of a dwarf named Ramil.

Development
Rent-a-Hero was first released in the German market during November 1998. An English version was finished in the third quarter of 1999, and was released by THQ in the United Kingdom that July. The game's North American distribution rights were acquired from THQ by publisher SouthPeak Interactive by September 1999. Initially due in January 2000, SouthPeak's North American release of Rent-a-Hero was ultimately canceled in March 2000.

Reception

German-language press

International reviews

See also
Deponia
House of Tales

References

External links
Official site (archived)

1998 video games
Adventure games
Cyberpunk video games
Rockstar Vienna games
SouthPeak Games
THQ games
Video games developed in Austria
Windows games
Windows-only games
Single-player video games
Magic Bytes games